The VIII Constitutional Government is the eighth and incumbent Constitutional Government (administration or cabinet) under the Constitution of East Timor.  Formed on 22 June 2018, and restructured in mid-2020, it is led by the country's seventh Prime Minister, Taur Matan Ruak.

Initial (AMP) composition (22 June 2018–24 June 2020)

Initially, the VIII Constitutional Government was drawn from and supported by a coalition known as the Alliance for Change and Progress (AMP), which was made up of the National Congress for Timorese Reconstruction (CNRT), the People's Liberation Party (PLP) and Kmanek Haburas Unidade Nasional Timor Oan (KHUNTO).

The Ministers, Deputy Ministers and Secretaries of State appointed to form the government as from 22 June 2018 until the government was restructured in mid-2020 were:

Ministers

Deputy Ministers

Secretaries of State

Restructured composition (24 June 2020–present)

Following the breakdown of the AMP coalition during the first few months of 2020, the government was restructured on 12 May 2020, new officials were appointed on 29 May and 24 June 2020.

Since then, the Ministers, Deputy Ministers and Secretaries of State in the government have been as stated in the tables below.

In March 2022, six officials in the government were replaced. The first four replacement officials were sworn in on 22 March 2022, and the remaining two on 31 March 2022.

Details of all of those officials, including the dates of their cessation or commencement in office, are included in the tables below.

Ministers

Deputy Ministers

Secretaries of State

References

Footnote

Notes

Further reading

External links
Program of the Eighth Constitutional Government – Government of East Timor
Timor-Leste's Eighth Constitutional Government – La’o Hamutuk: Timor-Leste Institute for Development Monitoring and Analysis

Cabinets established in 2018
Constitutional Governments of East Timor
2018 establishments in East Timor
Current governments